Wolfgang Lukschy (19 October 1905 – 10 July 1983 in Berlin) was a German actor. He performed in theater, film and television.

He made over 75 film and television appearances between 1940 and 1979. Possibly his most noted performances worldwide were his roles as Alfred Jodl in the 1962 American war film The Longest Day and as John Baxter in Sergio Leone's 1964 production A Fistful of Dollars alongside Clint Eastwood and Gian Maria Volonté.

Selected filmography

 Friedrich Schiller - The Triumph of a Genius (1940) – Student Boigeol
 Ohm Krüger (1941) – Junger englischer Offizer am englischen Hof
 Between Heaven and Earth (1942) – Mathias Rottwinkel
 Gefährtin meines Sommers (1943) – Jochen Binding, Manfreds Freund
 Ich werde dich auf Händen tragen (1943) – Dr. Viktor Büchner
 The Degenhardts (1944)
 The Woman of My Dreams (1944) – Oberingenieur Peter Groll
 Kamerad Hedwig (1945) – Karl Schulz
 Blocked Signals (1948) – Bruno Kalpak
 Das Mädchen Christine (1949) – Merian
 Die Andere (1949) – Dr. Rainer Litten
 Nights on the Nile (1949) – Dr. Robert Dirig – Schriftsteller
 Wedding with Erika (1950) – Fred
 Harbour Melody (1950)- Klaas Jansen
  (1950) – Gerd Terbrügge
 Veronika the Maid (1951) – Freddy
 Homesick for You (1952) – Georg Weiler
 The Day Before the Wedding (1952) – Dr. Leiden
 Drei, von denen man spricht (1953) – Robert Wiesinger
 Grandstand for General Staff (1953) – Flügeladjutant v. Lützelburg
  (1953) – Fritz
 The Country Schoolmaster (1954) – Heinrich Heinsius
 Emil and the Detectives (1954) – Oberwachtmeister Jeschke
 Die Deutschmeister (1955) – Kaiser Wilhelm II
 The Happy Wanderer (1955) – Klaus Hoppe
 Your Life Guards (1955) – Manager
 Rommel's Treasure (1955) – Petersen
  (1956) – Fritz Dacka
  (1956) – Georg
 The Zurich Engagement (1957) – Jürgen Kolbe
 Das haut hin (1957) – Carrosa, Löwendompteur 
 The Girl from the Marsh Croft (1958) – Per Eric Martinsson 
 Forbidden Paradise (1959) – Prof. Wetterstein
 The Night Before the Premiere (1959) – Kriminalkommissar Peter Hall
  (1960) – Chefarzt Dr. Feldhusen
 Until Money Departs You (1960) – Robert Grothe
  (1961) – Herr Berger
 The Dead Eyes of London (1961) – Stephan Judd
  (1961) – Bertelsen
 The Longest Day (1962) – Col. Gen. Alfred Jodl (uncredited)
 Sherlock Holmes and the Deadly Necklace (1962) – Peter Blackburn
  (1963) – Alfredo
 Scotland Yard Hunts Dr. Mabuse (1963) – Ernest Hyilard
 A Fistful of Dollars (1964) – Sheriff John Baxter
 Hercules and the Treasure of the Incas (1964) – El Puma
 The Seventh Victim (1964) – Ed Ranova
 Der Fall X701 (1964) – Inspector Prenton
 24 Hours to Kill (1965) – Kurt Hoffner
 The Dirty Game (1965) – Russian General
 The Hell of Manitoba (1965) – Charly – Barkepper
 Durchs wilde Kurrdistan (1965) – Ali Bei
 Old Surehand (1965) – Dick Edwards
 Komissar X – Drei Panther (1968) – TV Announcer (voice, uncredited)
 What Is the Matter with Willi? (1970) – Dr. Finz
 Frisch, fromm, fröhlich, frei (1970) – Bülow
 Die Feuerzangenbowle (1970) – Member of the Round table
 Die nackte Gräfin (1971) – Anatol
 The Odessa File (1974) – Sturmbannführer Kranz (uncredited)
 Inside Out (1975) – Reinhard Holtz
 The Expulsion from Paradise (1977) – Guest appearance
  (1977, TV Movie) – Tom Dawson

Gallery

References

External links and sources 
 

1905 births
1983 deaths
German male film actors
German male stage actors
German male television actors
Male actors from Berlin
Male Spaghetti Western actors
20th-century German male actors